Hugh Colin Hopper (29 April 1945 – 7 June 2009) was a British progressive rock and jazz fusion bass guitarist. He was a prominent member of the Canterbury scene, as a member of Soft Machine and other bands.

Biography

Early career
Starting in 1963 as bassist with The Daevid Allen Trio, alongside drummer Robert Wyatt, he alternated between free jazz and rhythm and blues. In 1964 with Brian Hopper (his brother), Robert Wyatt, Kevin Ayers and Richard Sinclair he formed The Wilde Flowers, a pop music group. Although they never released any records during their existence (a compilation was released 30 years later), The Wilde Flowers are acknowledged as the founders of the Canterbury scene and spawned its two most important groups, Soft Machine and Caravan.

With Soft Machine (1968–1973)
Hopper's role with Soft Machine was initially as the group's road manager, but he already composed for their first album The Soft Machine and played bass on one of its tracks. In 1969 he was recruited to be the group's bassist for their second album, Volume Two and, with Mike Ratledge and Robert Wyatt, he took part in a recording session for a solo album of Syd Barrett's (formerly of Pink Floyd, with whom the early Soft Machine had regularly gigged). Hopper continued with Soft Machine, playing bass and contributing numerous compositions until 1973. During his tenure the group evolved from a psychedelic pop group to an instrumental jazz-rock fusion band.  In 1972, shortly before leaving Soft Machine, he recorded the first record under his own name, 1984 (named after George Orwell's novel Nineteen Eighty-Four). This was a decidedly non-commercial record featuring lengthy solo pieces using tape loops as well as shorter pieces with a group. Hopper later reminisced about the record, "I don't think a lot of it was very successful, but I remember sitting for about three or four hours at Advision trying to record the sound of a mosquito so that I could use that as a bit of a loop."

1973 until 2009
After leaving Soft Machine, through the end of the 1970s, he worked with such groups as Stomu Yamashta's East Wind, Isotope, Gilgamesh, and the Carla Bley Band. He also played in a couple of cooperative bands alongside former Soft Machine saxophonist Elton Dean: Hopper/Dean/Tippett/Gallivan (with pianist Keith Tippett and drummer Joe Gallivan) and Soft Heap (with keyboard-player Alan Gowen and drummer Pip Pyle).

In the early 1980s Hopper gave up playing music for a couple of years, but by the mid-1980s he was actively working with several bands, including Pip Pyle's Equipe Out and Phil Miller's In Cahoots.  He also began playing with a group of Dutch musicians in a band initially called Hopper Goes Dutch.  After French guitarist Patrice Meyer joined, this group became known as the Hugh Hopper Franglo-Dutch Band.

After many years working primarily in instrumental, jazz-oriented groups including Short Wave, in the mid-1990s Hopper began occasionally working again in more rock-oriented vocal contexts, including several collaborations with the band Caveman Shoestore (using the name Hughscore) and with singer Lisa S. Klossner.  He also returned to his early tape loop experiments, but now using computer technology, in recordings such as Jazzloops (2002).

In the 1990s and 2000s several projects led Hopper to revisit his Soft Machine past. In 1998 he was asked to participate in a project by the French jazz collective Polysons, joining them in performances of Softs classics which featured Polysons members (Pierre-Olivier Govin and Jean-Rémy Guédon on saxes, Serge Adam on trumpet and François Merville on drums) plus organist Emmanuel Bex. The resulting Polysoft group was re-activated in 2002–03 to perform at Parisian club Le Triton, with fellow ex-Softs Elton Dean sitting in, resulting in a live CD, Tribute To Soft Machine, released on the club's own label.

Also in 2002–04, Hopper, Dean and two other former Soft Machine members (drummer John Marshall, and guitarist Allan Holdsworth) toured and recorded under the name SoftWorks. With another former Soft Machine member, guitarist John Etheridge, replacing Holdsworth, they toured and recorded as Soft Machine Legacy, playing some pieces from the original Soft Machine repertoire as well as new works. Three albums of theirs were released: Live in Zaandam (CD, rec. 2005/05/10), New Morning – The Paris Concert (DVD, rec. 2005/12/12) and the studio album Soft Machine Legacy (CD, 2006, rec. 09/2005). After Elton Dean who died in February 2006, Theo Travis Home replaced him, and Soft Machine Legacy recorded the album Steam, released in 2007.

Other occasional projects were Soft Bounds (with French musicians Sophia Domancich and Simon Goubert, first with Elton Dean and then Simon Picard), which like PolySoft released a live CD recorded at the Triton club, and Clear Frame, an improvising group with Charles Hayward, Lol Coxhill and Orphy Robinson (augmented for their first release by Robert Wyatt on cornet). Hopper also appeared on the 2004 debut solo album by No-Man singer Tim Bowness (My Hotel Year, on One Little Indian Records.

Hopper recorded two solo albums for, and established an online shop via, the highly regarded UK-based internet label, Burning Shed. He worked with Japanese musician and composer Yumi Hara Cawkwell as a duo called HUMI. They had a tour of Japan planned for early 2008, which did not happen due to Hopper's health.

Hopper was diagnosed with leukaemia in June 2008 and underwent chemotherapy. As a result of his illness and the treatment, he cancelled all his concert appearances. A Hugh Hopper benefit concert took place in December 2008 at the 100 Club in London and featured In Cahoots, members of Soft Machine Legacy, Delta Sax Quartet, Sophia Domancich and Simon Goubert, Yumi Hara Cawkwell, and the Alex Maguire Sextet. Another benefit was planned for late June 2009. He married his partner Christine on 5 June 2009 and died of leukaemia on 7 June. His funeral, a Tibetan Buddhist ceremony to respect Hugh's wishes, was held on 25 June 2009.

A series of ten CDs of unreleased live and studio recordings began release in 2014 by Gonzo MultiMedia to benefit Hugh's family.

Discography

Under his name

1973:  1984
1974:  Monster Band (released 1979)
1976: Hopper Tunity Box
1984: Hugh Hopper and Odd Friends (EP, released 1993)
1987: Alive!
1990: Meccano Pelorus
1994: Hooligan Romantics
1994: Carousel
1996: Best Soft (compilation)
2000: Parabolic Versions (collaborations)
2003: Jazzloops (collaborations)
2007: Numero D’Vol (Moonjune-Bandcamp)
2008: The Gift Of Purpose (live recording by Bone)
2014: Volume 1: Memories (archival collection)
2014: Volume 2: Frangloband (Triton Club, Paris, 2004)
2014: Volume 3: North & South (with Mike Travis, Aberdeen, 1995)
2014: Volume 4: Four by Hugh by Four (Bimhuis, Amsterdam, 2000)
2014: Volume 5: Heart to Heart (with Phil Miller, Amsterdam, 2007)
2014: Volume 6: Special Friends (Short Wave concerts 1992 through 1995)
2014: Volume 7: Soft Boundaries (Triton Club, Paris, 2005)
2014: Volume 8: Bass On Top (studio, Israel, 2007)
2015: Volume 9: Anatomy of Facelift (five performances of "Facelift" by Soft Machine, 1969 through 1971)
2015: Volume 10: Was A Friend (various one-off collaborations)

Collaborations

1976: Cruel But Fair (Hugh Hopper, Elton Dean, Keith Tippett, Joe Gallivan)
1977: Mercy Dash (Hugh Hopper, Elton Dean, Keith Tippett, Joe Gallivan; released 1985)
1978: Rogue Element (Soft Head: Hugh Hopper/Elton Dean/Alan Gowen/Dave Sheen)
1979: Soft Heap (Soft Heap: Hugh Hopper/Elton Dean/Alan Gowen/Pip Pyle)
1979: Al Dente (Soft Heap: Hugh Hopper/Elton Dean/Alan Gowen/Pip Pyle, live)
1980: Two Rainbows Daily (Hugh Hopper & Alan Gowen)
1980: Bracknell-Bresse Improvisations (Hugh Hopper, Alan Gowen, Nigel Morris; released 1996)
1983: Somewhere in France (Hugh Hopper & Richard Sinclair; released 1996)
1993: Short Wave Live (Hugh Hopper, Didier Malherbe, Phil Miller, Pip Pyle)
1994: A Remark Hugh Made (Hugh Hopper & Kramer)
1995: Adreamor (Hugh Hopper & Mark Hewins)
1996: Elephants in your head? (MASHU: Mark Hewins/Shyamal/Hugh Hopper)
1997: Huge (Hugh Hopper & Kramer)
1998: Different (Hugh Hopper & Lisa S. Klossner)
1998: The Mind in the Trees (Hugh Hopper, Elton Dean, Frances Knight, Vince Clarke; released 2003)
2000: Cryptids (Hugh Hopper & Lisa S. Klossner)
2000: The Swimmer (Hugh Hopper, Jan Ponsford, Frances Knight, Vince Clarke; released 2005)
2002: Flight'n Shade (Hugh Hopper & Micaël Gidon)
2003: Home (Jeff Sherman with Hugh Hopper)
2003: In a Dubious Manner (Hugh Hopper & Julian Whitfield)
2004: The Stolen Hour (comics by Matt Howarth)
2004: Bananamoon Obscura No. 2 - Live in the UK (Hugh Hopper, Daevid Allen, Pip Pyle)
2007: Numero D'Vol (Hugh Hopper, Simon Picard, Steve Franklin, Charles Hayward)
2007: 'Branes (Jeff Sherman & Hugh Hopper)
2008: Dune (Humi: Hugh Hopper & Yumi Hara Cawkwell)
2008: Goat Hopper (Hugh Hopper & Honey Ride Me A Goat)

With Soft Machine
Studio albums (see Soft Machine discography for live albums)
1968: The Soft Machine (one track only as player, others as well as composer)
1969: Volume Two
1970: Third
1971: Fourth
1972: Fifth
1973: Six
2003: Abracadabra (as Soft Works)
2006: Soft Machine Legacy (as Soft Machine Legacy)
2007 Steam (as Soft Machine Legacy)

Contributions

1962-9 Various Artists: Canterburied Sounds
1963 Daevid Allen Trio: Live 1963
1965-69: The Wilde Flowers: The Wilde Flowers
1968: Robert Wyatt: '68 (released 2013)
1969: Syd Barrett: The Madcap Laughs (two tracks)
1969: Kevin Ayers: Joy of a Toy
1973: Stomu Yamashta's East Wind: Freedom Is Frightening
1974: Robert Wyatt: Rock Bottom
1974: Robert Wyatt: Theatre Royal Drury Lane
1974: Stomu Yamashta: One by One
1975: Isotope: Illusion
1976: Isotope: Deep End
1976: Gary Windo: His Master's Bones
1978: Carla Bley Band: European Tour 1977
1978: Gilgamesh: Another Fine Tune You've Got Me Into
1981: Gilli Smyth & Mother Gong: Robot Woman
1984: Robert Wyatt: Work In Progress (EP)
1985: Pip Pyle: L'Equipe Out
1985: In Cahoots: Cutting Both Ways
1986: Patrice Meyer: Dromedaire viennois
1987: Anaid: Belladonna
1989: In Cahoots: Live 86–89
1991: Lindsay Cooper: Oh Moscow
1992: Daevid Allen: Twelve Selves
1994: Richard Sinclair: R.S.V.P.
1994: Conglomerate: Precisely the Opposite of What We Know to Be True
1995: Kramer: Still Alive In 95
1995: Various Artists: Unsettled Scores
1995: Caveman Hughscore: Caveman Hughscore
1995: Gizmo: Eyewitness
1997: Hughscore: Highspot Paradox
1998: Pip Pyle: 7 Year Itch
1998: Brainville: The Children's Crusade
1999: Caravan: All Over You Too
1999: Hughscore: Delta Flora
2001: Glass Cage: Glass Cage Paratactile
2002: Soft Works: Abracadabra
2002: Polysoft: Tribute to Soft Machine
2003: Glass: Live at Progman Cometh
2003: Robert Wyatt: Solar Flares Burn for You
2003: Soft Mountain: Soft Mountain
2003: Bone: Uses Wrist Grab
2004: Soft Bounds: Live at Le Triton
2004: Brian Hopper: If Ever I Am
2005: Glass: Illuminations
2005: NDIO: Airback 
2005: Brainville: Live in the UK
2005: Soft Machine Legacy: Live in Zaandam
2006: Soft Machine Legacy: Soft Machine Legacy
2007: Delta Saxophone Quartet: Dedicated To You... But You Weren't Listening: The Music of Soft Machine
2007: Soft Machine Legacy: Steam
2008: Clear Frame: Clear Frame
2008: Brainville3: Trial by Headline

Bibliography
 H.C. & L.T. Hopper: Thirty Kent Churches,  – Great Stour Publications – limited edition 750 cop. – with his father Leslie – (01.12.1978) – calligraphy and map: Leon Olin and Sylvia Gansford
 Hugh Hopper: The Rock Bass Manual – the complete guide to the electric bass guitar,  – Portland Publications (1984)

Filmography
 2015: Romantic Warriors III: Canterbury Tales (DVD)

References

External links
 Burning Shed records
 Mark Bloch's 1998 Interview with Hugh Hopper
 Hugh's site (hosted by Burning Shed) including link to the Hopper Archives
 1999 Calyx interview with Hugh Hopper
 2003 Cosmik Debris interview with Hugh Hopper
 Hugh Hopper at All About Jazz
 Hugh Hopper at jazz.com
 New York Times obituary

1945 births
2009 deaths
People from Whitstable
Deaths from cancer in England
Canterbury scene
Deaths from leukemia
Male bass guitarists
English jazz guitarists
English male guitarists
People from Canterbury
Soft Machine members
Columbia Records artists
Musicians from Kent
The Wilde Flowers members
Soft Heap members
In Cahoots members
Gilgamesh (band) members
20th-century English bass guitarists
British male jazz musicians
20th-century British male musicians
Progressive rock musicians
Progressive rock bass guitarists